Bread and salt is a welcome greeting ceremony in some Slavic, Nordic, Baltic, Balkan and other European cultures as well as in Middle Eastern cultures. It is also shared with some non-Slavic nations—Lithuanians, Latvians (both Baltic), Romanians (Romance) as well as some Finno-Ugric peoples like the Karelians—all of which are culturally and historically close to their Slavic neighbours. It remains common in Albania, Armenia, and among the Jewish diaspora. This tradition has also been observed in spaceflight.

Etymology
It is also common in Albania, Armenia (agh u hats), among the Jewish diaspora, and within parts of the Middle East under different names.

Cultural associations

Albania
Bread, salt and heart is a traditional Albanian way of honoring guests, it dates back from the Kanun of Lekë Dukagjini Chapter 18 - para.608: "The Guest shall be welcomed with Bread, salt and heart". Heart in the context is related with hospitality, the concept is based on giving the most expensive thing of that time which was salt to the awaited guest. Nowadays it is not commonly practiced in daily life.

Belarus, Russia, and Ukraine

When important, respected, or admired guests arrive, they are presented with a loaf of bread (usually a korovai) placed on a rushnyk (embroidered ritual cloth). A salt holder or a salt cellar is placed on top of the bread loaf or secured in a hole on the top of the loaf. On official occasions, the "bread and salt" is usually presented by young women dressed in national costumes (e.g., sarafan and kokoshnik).

The tradition gave rise to the Russian word that expresses a person's hospitality:  (literally: "bready-salty"). In general, the word "bread" is associated in Russian culture with hospitality, bread being the most respected food, whereas salt is associated with long friendship, as expressed in a Russian saying "to eat a pood of salt (together with someone)". Also historically the Russian Empire had a high salt tax that made salt a very expensive and prized commodity (see also the Moscow uprising of 1648).

There also is a traditional Russian greeting "". The phrase is to be uttered by an arriving guest as an expression of good wish towards the host's household. It was often used by beggars as an implicit hint to be fed, therefore a mocking rhymed response is known:  "Khleb da sol!" — "Yem da svoy!" (Хлеб да соль — ем да свой! "Bread and salt!" — "I am eating and it is my own!").

In Russian weddings, it is a traditional custom for the bride and groom to be greeted after the ceremony by family, usually the matriarch, with bread and salt in an embroidered cloth. This confers good health and fortune unto the newlyweds. In the Russian Orthodox Church, it is customary to greet the bishop at the steps of the church when he arrives for a pastoral visit to a church or monastery with bread and salt.

Bulgaria
Bread and salt is a traditional Bulgarian custom expressing hospitality, showing that the guest is welcomed. The bread and salt is commonly presented to guests by a woman.  Bulgarians usually make a certain type of bread for this occasion called pogacha, which is flat, fancy, and decorated. Regular bread is not usually used, although it may have been historically, but pogacha is much more common in this custom.

Usually, guests are presented with the pogacha, and the guest is supposed to take a small piece, dip into the salt and eat it. This custom is common for official visits regardless of whether the guest is foreign or Bulgarian. One notable example of this custom is when the Russians came to liberate Bulgaria from the Ottomans at the end of the 19th century. A common scene from that period was of a Bulgarian village woman welcoming Russian soldiers with bread and salt as a sign of gratitude.

Poland
In Poland, welcoming with bread and salt ("") is often associated with the traditional hospitality ("") of the Polish nobility (szlachta), who prided themselves on their hospitality. A 17th-century Polish poet, Wespazjan Kochowski, wrote in 1674: "O good bread, when it is given to guests with salt and good will!" Another poet who mentioned the custom was Wacław Potocki. The custom was, however, not limited to the nobility, as Polish people of all classes observed this tradition, reflected in old Polish proverbs. Nowadays, the tradition is mainly observed on wedding days, when newlyweds are greeted with bread and salt by their parents on returning from the church wedding.

North Macedonia
In the North Macedonia, this tradition still is practiced occasionally as a custom expressing hospitality. A certain type of bread, similar to that in Bulgaria and also by the same name—pogača (from ) is prepared.

The notable Macedonian and ex-Yugoslav ethno-jazz-rock group of the world music guitarist Vlatko Stefanovski had the name "Leb i Sol", which means "bread and salt" and speaks itself about this term of hospitality as something basic and traditional.

Romania
As in the neighbouring Slavic countries, bread and salt is a traditional Romanian custom expressing hospitality, showing that the guest is welcomed. In Transylvania bread and salt are served to protect against weather demons.

Serbia
Bread and salt is a traditional welcoming of guests, being customary to offer it before anything else, with bread having an important place in Serbian tradition, used in rituals. The traditional bread, pogača, is a symbol of family unity and goodness, and salt prosperity and security for the guest.  It is part of the state protocol, in use since the Principality of Serbia, often used when welcoming foreign representatives.

Slovakia and Czechia 
The long-tradition of the Slovakia and the Czech Republic as Slavic countries is to welcome important visits with bread and salt. An example is the welcome of Pope Francis in Bratislava 2021 by president Zuzana Čaputová.

Finland, Estonia, Latvia, and Lithuania
In Finland, Estonia, Latvia, and Lithuania, bread and salt were traditionally given as a symbol of blessing for a new home. Instead of white bread, dark fiber-rich rye bread was used. The tradition is still kept alive in Eastern Karelia and in Ingria by the minor Baltic Finnic peoples.

Germany
Bread and salt are given away for different reasons:
 to the wedding for a lasting alliance between spouses
 to move into a house to wish prosperity and fertility.

In northern Germany and Bohemia (Czech Republic) bread and salt are traditionally put into the diaper of a newborn.

Arab culture
Arab culture also has a concept of "bread and salt" ( or ) but not in the context of welcoming, but as an expression of alliance by eating together, symbolizing the rapprochement between two persons. Eating bread and salt with a friend is considered to create a moral obligation which requires gratitude. This attitude is also expressed by Arab phrases such as "there are bread and salt between us" ( or ), and "salt between them" which are terms of alliance.

Jewish culture
A similar practice also exists among Jews in the Diaspora and in Israel. After the ceremony of Kiddush, a piece of Challah is dipped in salt and eaten. The Challah is a staple food eaten on special occasions, like holidays and weddings, as well as every Saturday. Bread and salt were also used in the past at welcoming ceremonies, given to respected persons.

Iranian culture
In the Iranian culture when a guest is welcomed into the home, it's said that they have eaten bread and salt, and this leads to loyalty of the guest.

United Kingdom
In Northern England and Scotland the tradition is observed on New Year's Day, where the first individual to enter a house may be required by tradition to bring bread, salt and coal.

In space
With the advent of the Soviet space program, this tradition has spread into space, where appropriately small packages of bread and salt are used nowadays. It was observed at the Apollo–Soyuz Test Project and the Salyut programme, when crackers and salt tablets were used in the spaceship.  Bread chunks and salt were used as a welcome at the Mir space station, a tradition that was extended on the International Space Station. Bread and salt are also used to welcome cosmonauts returning to Earth.

In fiction

The custom of serving bread and salt to guests is a recurring reference in George R. R. Martin's A Song of Ice and Fire novels, where the welcome ritual serves not only as a Westerosi tradition of hospitality, but also a formal assurance of "guest right", a sacred bond of trust and honor guaranteeing that nobody in attendance, hosts and guests alike, shall be harmed.  Violating the guest right is widely considered among the highest moral crimes, an affront worthy of the worst damnation, rivaled only by kinslaying. Game of Thrones, the associated television series, prominently features the tradition in season three, episode 9, "The Rains of Castamere".

In Season 2, Episode 4 of Peaky Blinders, Alfie Solomons offers Charles Sabini bread and salt as Sabini offers a white flag of truce.

Rudyard Kipling referenced bread and salt in a number of works. In The Ballad of East and West, leavened bread and salt is mentioned as binding an oath of blood brothership.  At the beginning of Puck of Pook's Hill Puck establishes his credentials with the child protagonists by asking them to sprinkle plenty of salt on their shared meal. ""That'll show you the sort of person I am."

In Rosemary Sutcliff's historical novel Outcast, bread and salt is referred to as a sign of belonging to a tribe: "You are my people, my own people, by hearth fire and bread and salt".

In The Count of Monte Cristo by Alexandre Dumas, Chapter 72 is titled "Bread and Salt". The character Mercedes attempts to coax the main character into eating fruit, as part of an Arabian custom to ensure that those who have shared food and drink together under one roof would be eternal friends.

Bread and salt are given as a housewarming gift in one scene of the 1946 film It's a Wonderful Life.

References

Bibliography
R. E. F. Smith & David Christian,  Bread and Salt: A Social and Economic History of Food and Drink in Russia (1984)

External links

Albanian culture
Slavic culture
Lithuanian traditions
Greetings
Traditions
Religious food and drink
National symbols of Ukraine
National symbols of Russia
National symbols of Belarus
Guest greeting food and drink
National symbols of Serbia
Albanian traditions
Serbian traditions
Edible salt
Breads